Jesse Jackson White (born 9 January 1988 in Melbourne) is a professional Australian rules footballer who plays for SANFL club North Adelaide Football Club and formerly for the Sydney Swans and Collingwood Football Club in the Australian Football League (AFL). He was drafted by Sydney Swans with pick 79 in the 2006 national draft.

Early life
White was born in Melbourne. His family moved to the Gold Coast when he was two years old, and he attended John Paul College during his high school years. He was first selected to represent Queensland in basketball at under 12 level, and continued to make representative teams up to under 18 level. In 2005, he rejected a scholarship offer from the Australian Institute of Sport to concentrate on Australian football.

Junior football
White played his junior football at the Surfers Paradise Australian Football Club on the Gold Coast. He was selected to represent Queensland in 2004 at under 16 level, while playing for Surfers Paradise. He switched to the Southport Australian Football Club to play both under 18 and senior football. Despite having a good year for Southport and the under 18 Queensland team, he was overlooked in the 2005 AFL draft. He remained at Southport for the 2006 season, winning the QAFL premiership and was a standout performer in Queensland's victorious run at the 2006 AFL Under 18 Championships.

AFL career

White was drafted by the Sydney Swans with pick 79 in the 2006 AFL draft. Despite being drafted in 2006, White didn't make his league debut until round 6, 2008, under controversial circumstances, when White mistakenly entered the playing field before Darren Jolly had left the field in the final minutes of their drawn match against . The AFL fined Sydney $50,000 for having an extra man on the field for approximately 18 seconds, which led to the formation of the new interchange policy.

In round 22 of the 2009 AFL season, White was rewarded with a nomination for the 2009 AFL Rising Star award.

White's playing style is primarily a forward that can also ruck. After Peter Everitt retired, White played as the second ruck to Darren Jolly. After Barry Hall's retirement and subsequent trade to Western Bulldogs in the 2009 off-season, White was moved into the forward line, kicking four goals in his first match as a forward. The Swans re-signed him in 2010 on a three-year contract to prevent the new club,  from recruiting him. Despite promising performances as a forward throughout the 2010 season, he spent considerable time in the North East Australian Football League (NEAFL) throughout 2011 and the 2012 premiership year, due to inconsistent form.

The subsequent AFL investigation from the attempted trade discovered that Adelaide had breached the salary cap and contract laws governing the players. White remained a Swans player for the 2013 season. With Goodes injured for most of the season, White was often instrumental, kicking 20 goals in 15 games, with his best match against Adelaide, individually outscoring Adelaide with three goals to three quarter time.

On 10 August 2017, White announced his retirement from AFL football at the end of the season.

Post-AFL career 
Following his retirement from AFL, White began training with National Basketball League side Melbourne United. filters.

In 2018, he returned to football signing with SANFL club Glenelg Football Club.

In 2019, Jesse won the SANFL premiership and the Glenelg Football Club J H Eller Best and Fairest award and announced his retirement

Statistics
 As of the completion of the 2017 season

|- style="background:#eaeaea;"
! scope="row" style="text-align:center" | 2008
|style="text-align:center;"|
| 18 || 2 || 0 || 0 || 5 || 4 || 9 || 5 || 5 || 0.0 ||0.0 || 2.5 || 2 || 4.5 || 2.5 || 2.5
|-
! scope="row" style="text-align:center" | 2009
|style="text-align:center;"|
| 18 || 18 || 20 || 13 || 86 || 56 || 142 || 72 || 20 || 1.1 || 0.7 || 4.8 || 3.1 || 7.9 || 4 || 1.1
|- style="background:#eaeaea;"
! scope="row" style="text-align:center" | 2010
|style="text-align:center;"|
| 18 || 20 || 22 || 12 || 87 || 81 || 168 || 65 || 20 || 1.1 || 0.6 || 4.4 || 4.1 || 8.5 || 3.3 || 1
|-
! scope="row" style="text-align:center" | 2011
|style="text-align:center;"|
| 18 || 13 || 9 || 1 || 54 || 48 || 102 || 26 || 39 || 0.6 || 0.4 || 12.1 || 11.0 || 23.1 || 4.5 || 3.1
|- style="background:#eaeaea;"
! scope="row" style="text-align:center" | 2012
|style="text-align:center;"|
| 18 || 3 || 2 || 0 || 19 || 10 || 29 || 12 || 7 || 0.7 || 0.0 || 6.3 || 3.3 || 9.6 || 4 || 2.3
|-
! scope="row" style="text-align:center" | 2013
|style="text-align:center;"|
| 18 || 15 || 20 || 12 || 109 || 81 || 190 || 72 || 26 || 1.3 || 0.8 || 7.3 || 5.4 || 12.7 || 4.8 || 1.7
|-style="background:#eaeaea;"
! scope="row" style="text-align:center" | 2014
|style="text-align:center;"|
| 18 || 18 || 20 || 14 || 126 || 63 || 189 || 59 || 38 || 1.1 || 0.8 || 7.0 || 3.3 || 10.3 || 3.3 || 2.1
|-
! scope="row" style="text-align:center" | 2015
|style="text-align:center;"|
| 9 || 18 || 27 || 19 || 145 || 79 || 224 || 88 || 30 || 1.5 || 1.1 || 8.1 || 4.4 || 12.4 || 4.9 || 1.7
|-style="background:#eaeaea;"
! scope="row" style="text-align:center" | 2016
|style="text-align:center;"|
| 9 || 16 || 23 || 20 || 152 || 59 || 211 || 86 || 35 || 1.4 || 1.3 || 9.5 || 3.7 || 13.2 || 5.4 || 2.2
|-
! scope="row" style="text-align:center" | 2017
|style="text-align:center;"|
| 9 || 4 || 5 || 5 || 34 || 16 || 50 || 19 || 6 || 1.3 || 1.3 || 8.5 || 4.0 || 12.5 || 4.8 || 1.5
|- class="sortbottom"
! colspan=3| Career
! 127
! 148
! 106
! 817
! 497
! 1314
! 504
! 226
! 1.2
! 0.8
! 6.4
! 3.9
! 10.4
! 4.0
! 1.8
|}

References

External links

 
 

1988 births
Living people
Australian rules footballers from Melbourne
Australian rules footballers from Queensland
Sydney Swans players
Sportspeople from the Gold Coast, Queensland
Southport Australian Football Club players
Collingwood Football Club players
Glenelg Football Club players
People educated at John Paul College (Brisbane)